Sugar and Spice is the 1966 debut album by The Cryan' Shames, originally released in mono (CL 2589) and in stereo (CS 9389). The cover photography was done by Don Bronstein. The album was recorded in two days (August 25 and 26, 1966). The liner photography was done by Rich Dienethal of River Grove, Illinois. The cover photograph was taken at The Sweet Tooth in Pipers Alley, Old Town, Chicago. The album is dedicated to Fred Bohlander. The back of the album contains six photos of the band in concert. There are four original songs on this record, all written by lead guitarist, Jim Fairs: "We Could Be Happy", "Ben Franklin's Almanac", "July" and "I Wanna Meet You".

Track listing
All tracks composed by Jim Fairs; except where indicated
Side 1
"Sugar and Spice" (Fred Nightingale) - 2:26
"We Could Be Happy" - 2:32
"Heat Wave" (George James Webb, George Duffield, Jr./Holland-Dozier-Holland) - 2:07
"We'll Meet Again" (Ross Parker, Hughie Charles) - 2:07
"Ben Franklin's Almanac" - 1:56
"She Don't Care About Time" (Gene Clark) - 2:56

Side 2
"Hey Joe (Where You Gonna Go)" (Chet Powers) - 2:39
"If I Needed Someone" (George Harrison) - 2:19
"July" - 1:33
"I Want To Meet You" - 2:03
"We Gotta Get out of This Place" (Barry Mann, Cynthia Weil) - 3:40

Personnel 
The Cryan' Shames
Tom Doody – vocals
Jim Pilster – tambourine
Dennis Conroy – drums
Gerry Stone – guitar
Jim Fairs – guitar
Dave Purple – bass, organ, harpsichord

References

External links
Sugar & Spice - Sugar And Spice Original Recording Reissued by Sundazed
Blogspot - review of the re-issue by Sundazed

1966 debut albums
Columbia Records albums
The Cryan' Shames albums